Effie F. Kamman (1868-1933) was an American composer, pianist, music teacher, and vaudeville performer. She was known for composing "The Dance of the Brownies" (1893), a popular tune inspired by the children's books by Palmer Cox.

Early life 
Effie F. Kamman was from Detroit, the daughter of Frederick Kamman and Minerva A. Howlett Kamman. Her father was a butcher.

Career 

Kamman was a music teacher in Detroit, who also gained notice as a performer in vaudeville. She toured in several shows, including The Fencing Master (1894), Run on the Bank (1895), The Governors (1897), Hunting for Hawkins (1901), and On the Stroke of 12 (1903). She sang soprano parts, but also sometimes toured as a "lady baritone" novelty singing act. She was also the music and art editor for the newspaper Detroit Journal. Later in her career, she played piano on radio, and in theatres during silent films.

Published works by Kamman included
"The Dance of the Brownies" (1893)
"The American Two-Step" (1895)
"Clover" (1898),
"Darktown Doings" (1898)
"Dance of the White Rats" (1901)
"Hunting for Hawkins" (1901)
"I Love You Yet" (1903)
"Skirmish" (1903),
"What's Your Hurry?" (1922)
"The Old Fashioned Love of the Days Long Ago" (1928)
"In Twilight Land" (1928)

Personal life 
Effie F. Kamman lived in Los Angeles, California, for several years, until shortly before her death. She died in 1933, aged 64 years, in Detroit. Her gravesite is with her parents' and her sister's, in Michigan.

References

External links 

 
 Effie F. Kamman, "What's Your Hurry?" (1922), at Historic Sheet Music Collection, Oregon Digital.
 A 1922 recording of "What's Your Hurry?" (1922), at Internet Archive.

1868 births
1933 deaths
American composers
Vaudeville performers